Landahaussy or Landahussy (possibly ) is a small village and townland near Plumbridge in County Tyrone, Northern Ireland. It is within the Derry City and Strabane District Council area.

People 
It is the birthplace of mathematician James MacCullagh.

References 

Villages in County Tyrone